Reef Mesika (born 15 June 1989) is an Israeli footballer who plays for Hapoel Umm al-Fahm. He is the son of Haim Messika, a former footballer who also played for Maccabi Netanya and Hapoel Kfar Saba.

He is of a Tunisian-Jewish descent.

Club career statistics
(correct as of 1 June 2022)

Honours
Liga Leumit
Winner (1): 2021-22
Runner-up (1): 2014-15

Liga Alef
Winner (2): 2018-19, 2020-21

References

External links
Profile at One

1989 births
Living people
Israeli Jews
Israeli footballers
Beitar Nes Tubruk F.C. players
Maccabi Netanya F.C. players
Hapoel Nir Ramat HaSharon F.C. players
Maccabi Herzliya F.C. players
Hapoel Herzliya F.C. players
Hapoel Rishon LeZion F.C. players
Hapoel Bnei Lod F.C. players
Hapoel Tel Aviv F.C. players
Hapoel Ra'anana A.F.C. players
Hapoel Kfar Saba F.C. players
Hapoel Ashkelon F.C. players
Hapoel Umm al-Fahm F.C. players
Hapoel Hadera F.C. players
Maccabi Bnei Reineh F.C. players
Israeli Premier League players
Liga Leumit players
Israeli people of Tunisian-Jewish descent
Footballers from Netanya
Association football midfielders